A National Treasure (국보; 國寶) is a tangible artifact, site, or building deemed by the Government of North Korea to have significant historical or artistic value to the country.

History
The first list of Korean cultural treasures was designated by Governor-General of Korea in 1938 during the Japanese occupation with "The Act of Treasures of the Joseon dynasty".

Nos. 1-50

Nos. 51-100

Nos. 101-150

Nos. 151-193

See also

 Cultural assets of North Korea
 Natural monuments of North Korea
 National Treasure (South Korea)
 Complex of Koguryo Tombs
 History of Korea
 Culture of Korea
 List of World Heritage Sites in Asia#North Korea (1)

Footnotes

References
 http://www.kcpia.or.kr/kcpia_mail/mail_template.php?menu=4&filetype=view&index_key=20 
 http://cafe.naver.com/historyexam.cafe?iframe_url=/ArticleList.nhn%3F%26search.boardtype=%26search.menuid=333%26search.clubid=15134008%26search.totalCount=151%26search.page=5
 https://web.archive.org/web/20131219195853/http://north.nricp.go.kr/nrth/kor/inx/index.jsp

 
Tourist attractions in North Korea
North Korea-related lists